Kings of Comedy is an Australian comedy documentary series for blokey men, aired on Nine Network. It gets repeated annually during the TV Week Logies after party. Contains scenes from Dave Allen, Peter Cook & Dudley Moore, Graham Kennedy, and The Two Ronnies.

Nine Network original programming
Australian comedy television series
2007 Australian television series debuts
2007 Australian television series endings